The Girgarre railway line is a closed  branch railway line situated in the Loddon Mallee region of Victoria, Australia. The line was primarily built to serve the livestock and other farm industries as well as providing a general goods and passenger service to townships in the area.

History
The line was opened in May 1917, and closed in 2 stages from March 1975 to October 1987.

Special trains
 As part of the 23rd tour, the Better Farming Train visited on 29 August 1928.
 19 November 1924 - Joined with a train from Colbinabbin to form the Rushworth great picnic train (1300 passengers). It we the longest train, drawn by two engines, that officials had seen at Flinders Street Station.

Stations

Accidents
 1929 - 28 January - The engine of the mixed train from Rushworth to Girgarre failed at Rushworth.

References

Closed regional railway lines in Victoria (Australia)
5 ft 3 in gauge railways in Australia
Railway lines opened in 1917
Railway lines closed in 1987
1917 establishments in Australia
1987 disestablishments in Australia
Transport in Loddon Mallee (region)